State Road 115 (SR 115) is a state highway in the U.S. state of Florida.

History
SR 115 was built in separately named segments by the Jacksonville Expressway Authority. The land for the southern section, south of Beach Boulevard, was donated by Jacksonville's Skinner family. Three siblings – Bryant, Dottie and Richard Jr. – inherited thousands of acres in southeast Duval county and needed roads through the area to access their property and facilitate development. The construction of Southside Boulevard was key to the growth of the south side of Jacksonville.

Route description

Southern segment
SR 115 runs north as Southside Blvd from its terminus at US 1, providing access for The Avenues. Right afterwards, the road goes through the largely residential and commercial south side of Jacksonville with crossings at Baymeadows Road (SR 152), Butler Boulevard (SR 202), Beach Boulevard (US 90), and Atlantic Boulevard (SR 10). At the Southside Connector (SR 113), SR 115 turns sharply to become the Arlington Expressway, heading west into downtown via the Mathews Bridge, where it turns north, becoming the Martin Luther King Jr. Parkway (former Haines Street Expressway), and again turning to the west along with the MLK Parkway (now the former 20th Street Expressway), before reaching I-95. The portion on the MLK Parkway is signed only as US 1 Alt. and US 1, not SR 115.

The southern segment serves primarily as a conduit between the residential neighborhoods of Southside and the commercialized areas farther north and downtown. Heavy traffic is commonplace along most of the road. To improve traffic flow, especially during rush-hours, the FDOT is planning a major redesign of the intersections just north and south of the interchange with SR 202 (Butler Boulevard) to be carried out by the mid-2020s.

Northern segment
Approximately two miles of SR 115 run unsigned along I-95. The second section of signed road runs from the junction of I-95 and Norwood Avenue (SR 117) through northwest Jacksonville, passing through the Lake Forest section of the city before crossing a bridge over the Ribault River, where it enters Riverview and then crosses another bridge over the Trout River into the eastern edge of the College Park neighborhood, before entering the Garden City neighborhood at the intersection with Florida State Road 104. FL 115 continues through Garden City, until the interchange with I-295 and runs between the Forest Trails and the territory near the Jacksonville International Airport before crossing a bridge over the Thomas Creek where it crosses the Duval-Nassau County Line, and ending at New Kings Rd (US 1/US 23) in Callahan.

The northern segment has the same function as the southern, except that it is built to lower standards and carries traffic south from the densely populated areas northwest of downtown into the heart of the city. Northbound, it is also an alternative to US 1/US 23 as a route to Callahan.

Exit list

SR 115A

Two unsigned sections of State Road 115A (SR 115A) exist in close proximity to each other east of Downtown Jacksonville. Some sources (including FDOT's straight line diagrams) indicate a third SR 115A on the ramps connecting SR 115 to I-95 at exit 340.

References

115
115
115
115